Baghdadi is a residential neighbourhood in Lyari, located in the Karachi South district of Karachi, Pakistan.

References

External links 
 Karachi website - Archived

Neighbourhoods of Karachi
Lyari Town